Jean-Georges-Othon-Martin-Victorin-Zacharie Willmar (5 September 1763 - 1 January 1831) was a jurist, and governor of Luxembourg from 1817 to 1830. 

Born in Prüm, Willmar was a lawyer in the Conseil souverain. When Luxembourg was occupied by French Revolutionary troops, Willmar was appointed the "Agent national" of the commission which transitionally administered the country. When Luxembourg was incorporated into the Département des Forêts, he was appointed president of the criminal tribunal.

In April 1800 he was nominated under-prefect of Bitburg.

In 1815 he became provisional governor of the Grand Duchy, and on 29 May 1817 was made governor. An important part of this function was inspecting the Grand Duchy village by village and writing reports on the conditions here. A recurring theme of these reports was the poor state of the roads. As governor, he also reported to The Hague on the ever-rising discontent of the people over taxes, seen as too high and unfair.

After the Belgian Revolution, he remained loyal to the Dutch king, although Jean-Baptiste Nothomb had indicated that he could remain governor of a Belgian Luxembourg, and his son Jean-Jacques Willmar could become president of the tribunal of Arlon. There was however, little will to compromise on the part of the Dutch King, and Prince William II was imposed as governor of the southern provinces.

On 1 January 1831 he died in Luxembourg city. 

Jean-Georges Willmar was married twice: first to Marie-Catherine Graas, who died in 1794, and with whom he had five children, including Jean-Jacques Willmar, and secondly to Marie-Jeanne Graas, Marie-Catherine's sister, with whom he had one son.

Further reading 
 Robert, A.; Cougny, G. Dictionnaire des parlementaires français de 1789 à 1889.
 Kayser, Edouard M. Quelque part entre Vienne et Londres... - Le Grand-Duché de Luxembourg de 1815 à 1867. Luxembourg: Éditions Saint-Paul, 1990.

External links 
 Alphonse Sprunck, « Le Gouverneur Willmar », Biographie nationale du pays de Luxembourg.

18th-century Luxembourgian lawyers
Luxembourgian Orangists
19th-century Luxembourgian judges